Nuclear Assault was an American thrash metal band formed in New York City in 1984. Part of the mid-to-late 1980s thrash metal movement, they were one of the main bands of the genre to emerge from the East Coast along with Overkill, Whiplash, Toxik, Carnivore, and Anthrax, the last of which was co-founded by Nuclear Assault bassist Dan Lilker, who left Anthrax shortly after the release of their first album. Nuclear Assault released five full-length albums and toured relentlessly throughout the 1980s and early 1990s, and broke up in 1995. The band reunited briefly in 1997 and then permanently in 2002 before subsequently breaking up again in 2022.

Nuclear Assault had released six studio albums to date, in addition to two live albums, four EPs and one compilation album. Their most successful records are Survive (1988) and Handle with Care (1989), which peaked at Nos. 145 and 126 on the Billboard 200 chart, respectively. Other than four new songs in 2015 on the EP Pounder, the band had not released a full-length studio album since 2005's Third World Genocide, and they would continue to perform live sporadically over the years before calling it quits once again in 2022.

History

Early career (1984–1985)
After the release of Anthrax's debut album Fistful of Metal, bassist Dan Lilker, a founding member of the group, was fired by the band. He decided to pursue a more aggressive style of music and formed Nuclear Assault with guitarist-vocalist John Connelly, who had been involved in an early version of Anthrax. They were joined by guitarist Mike Bogush and drummer Scott Duboys (later of Cities, Cycle Sluts from Hell and Warrior Soul). They then recorded the first of two demos, which included the songs "Stranded in Hell", "The Plague", and "Hang the Pope".

The group's first live performance was at the Union Jack in South River, New Jersey, in late 1984. Bogush was later replaced by Anthony Bramante. Bramante's first live performance with the group was at L'Amour in Brooklyn, New York, in April 1985. Shortly after the performance, Duboys left the band and was replaced by drummer Glenn Evans formerly of New Jersey-based band T.T. Quick.

First three albums and rise to fame (1986–1990)
The second demo Live Suffer Die was recorded and the band began touring the United States consistently. The band signed a multi-album contract with Combat Records and recorded the Game Over album in April 1986, released to critical acclaim later that year. Game Over was followed by an extended play called The Plague, which was released to coincide with a 1987 European tour with Agent Steel and Atomkraft. Later, feeling constrained by their contract with Combat, the band signed with I.R.S. Records and recorded Survive in 1988. The album reached number 145 on the US Billboard 200 chart and Nuclear Assault set off on a 180-day world tour in the United States and Europe; first as an opening act for Slayer and later headlining with British group Acid Reign as a support act. The next album, 1989's Handle with Care, would see the band at their commercial peak, hitting the US chart at number 126, and peaking in the UK Albums Chart at No. 60, with more touring, including a trip to Japan and a U.S. tour opening for Testament and Savatage. The band released their first live album, Live at the Hammersmith Odeon, in 1990, but internal troubles were causing problems for the band.

Two more albums, departure of Lilker and split (1991–1995)
Constant touring and recording was taking its toll on the band, and there was a rumor that the band might split. The recording of Out of Order was problematic as all four members were in the process of making solo projects. Lead songwriter Connelly was conspicuously absent from the recording process. He only sang on five of the songs and played the guitar on one ("Quocustodiat" was his only full writing credit), leaving Evans and Lilker to do most of the recording alone. Out of Order was poorly received and during the subsequent tour in 1991–1992 there was some line-up shuffling – Connelly moved to vocals only for a time with second guitarist Dave DiPietro joining in 1992. Founding member Lilker departed to concentrate on Brutal Truth and longtime guitarist Bramante followed by the end of the year.

Undaunted, Connolly, Evens and DiPietro recorded Something Wicked for IRS/EMI in 1993 with new bassist Scott Metaxas, the title track featuring in the film Warlock: The Armageddon. Reviews again were somewhat unfavorable, as Nuclear Assault struggled to adapt to a less thrash-friendly music scene. After touring Europe and the US for much of 1993 the band returned with a new line up of Dave Spitz on bass and a returning Bramante, joining Connelly and Evans for more North American touring before slowly coming to a halt in early 1995.The band contributed their take on Die Hard for a Venom tribute album in 1995 before calling it a day.

Nuclear Assault's classic lineup later reunited for one concert in 1997 (put on by Eric Paone of Candy Striper Death Orgy in New Hampshire) then, two more shows the following year with Eric Paone on bass guitar in New England before parting ways a second time.

Nuclear Assault in the 21st century (2000–2022)
The classic lineup reformed once again in 2002 to perform at the Metal Meltdown and Wacken festivals and subsequently recorded a live album entitled Alive Again, Bramante leaving for the last time and adding guitarist Eric Burke in time for several European tours, first with Testament and Death Angel in, then with Exodus and Agent Steel both in 2003. A new studio album entitled Third World Genocide followed in 2005, with yet more touring, including a South American tour with Death Angel. and a headlining European tour. The band released the Louder, Faster, Harder DVD before more US touring in 2006.

From 2007-2012 Nuclear Assault occasionally played shows, returning to Japan and South America along with a guest appearance at the Maryland Deathfest and at the Metal Merchants Festival in Oslo, Norway, in January 2011.

In 2013, it was announced that Nuclear Assault was working on a new album, which was due for release in 2015. They released an EP on June 1, 2015, titled Pounder, which featured "four killer old-school thrash" songs written by Dan Lilker and John Connelly. The band embarked on the "Final Assault" tour to support the EP in 2015-16. By 2022, however, Nuclear Assault had continued to perform live sporadically, mostly in South America as well as both the East Coast and West Coast of the United States.

On November 20, 2022, Nuclear Assault announced on social media that they had once again called it quits.

Members
Former members
John Connelly – lead vocals, rhythm guitar (1984–1995, 1997–1998, 2001-2022)
Dan Lilker – bass, backing vocals (1984–1992, 1997, 2001–2022)
Glenn Evans – drums (1984–1995, 1997–1998, 2001–2015)
Anthony Bramante – lead guitar (1984–1992, 1994–1995, 2001–2002)
Scott Duboys – drums (1984)
Mike Bogush – lead guitar (1984)
Dave DiPietro – lead guitar (1992–1995)
Scott Metaxas – bass (1993–1994)
Eric Burke – lead guitar (2002–2005, 2006–2022)
Scott Harrington – lead guitar (2005)

Touring musicians
Eric Paone – bass (1998)
Nicholas Barker – drums (2015)

Timeline

Discography

Studio albums
1986: Game Over
1988: Survive
1989: Handle with Care
1991: Out of Order
1993: Something Wicked
2005: Third World Genocide

EPs
1986: Brain Death
1987: The Plague
1988: Good Times, Bad Times
1988: Fight to be Free (single)
2015: Pounder

Live albums 
1992: Live at the Hammersmith Odeon
2003: Alive Again

Compilations
1997: Assault & Battery

Demos
1984: Nuclear Assault demo
1985: Live, Suffer, Die

VHS/DVDs
1990: Handle With Care European Tour '89 (VHS)
1991: Radiation Sickness (VHS, re-released on DVD in 2007)
2006: Louder Harder Faster DVD

Music videos
Brainwashed (1988)
Critical Mass (1989)
Trail of Tears (1989)
Something Wicked (1993)
Behind Glass Walls (1995) (Never Released)
Price of Freedom (2005)
Long Haired Asshole (2005)

References

External links

  (archived)

1984 establishments in New York City
American thrash metal musical groups
Crossover thrash groups
Heavy metal musical groups from New York (state)
I.R.S. Records artists
Musical groups established in 1984
Musical quartets
Musical groups disestablished in 1995
Musical groups reestablished in 1997
Musical groups disestablished in 1997
Musical groups reestablished in 2002
Musical groups disestablished in 2008
Musical groups reestablished in 2010
Political music groups
Combat Records artists